The 2013 season was IFK Göteborg's 108th in existence, their 81st season in Allsvenskan and their 37th consecutive season in the league. They competed in Allsvenskan where they finished third, Svenska Cupen where they won the competition, Svenska Supercupen where they finished as runners-up and the UEFA Europa League where they were knocked out in the second qualifying round. IFK Göteborg also participated in one competition in which the club continued playing in for the 2014 season, 2013–14 Svenska Cupen. The season began with the group stage of Svenska Cupen in March, league play started in April and lasted until November, Svenska Supercupen was the last competitive match of the season.

The club won their 6th Svenska Cupen title on 26 May 2013 when they defeated Djurgårdens IF after a penalty shoot-out in the final at Friends Arena.

Summary

Svenska Supercupen
IFK Göteborg qualified for the 2013 Svenska Supercupen by winning the 2012–13 Svenska Cupen on 26 May 2013. The match was played at Swedbank Stadion on 10 November 2013 and the club's opponents were 2013 Allsvenskan winners Malmö FF. This was the fourth time that the club competed in Svenska Supercupen. The previous times had ended in a win against Kalmar FF in 2008 and two losses against Kalmar FF in 2009 and AIK in 2010. The match ended in a 3–2 win for Malmö FF after Emil Forsberg scored two goals and Guillermo Molins scored the third and winning goal in injury time. Philip Haglund and Lasse Vibe scored the goals for IFK Göteborg.

UEFA Europa League
IFK Göteborg qualified for the 2013–14 UEFA Europa League by merit of winning the 2012–13 Svenska Cupen. The club entered the competition in the second round of qualification. The draw for the second qualifying round was held on 23 June, IFK Göteborg was seeded in the draw. The club was drawn against the 2012–13 Slovakian third-placed team Trenčín. This was the first time ever that IFK Göteborg faced Slovakian opposition in European competition. The first leg of the fixture was played at home on 18 July and ended in a 0–0 draw. The match was played at Olympia in Helsingborg since both Gamla Ullevi and Ullevi was busy with other events. The away fixture at Mestský štadión in Dubnica nad Váhom was played on 25 July and ended with a 2–1 loss for IFK Göteborg after two goals from Fanendo Adi, which confirmed the aggregate score to 2–1 in favour of Trenčín.

Key events
 1 November 2012: Midfielder Stefan Selaković leaves the club. On 23 January 2013 he joined Allsvenskan rival Halmstads BK.
 7 November 2012: Club director Seppo Vaihela announces his resignation from the club.
 16 November 2012: Chairman Kent Olsson announces his resignation from the club.
 23 November 2012: Forward Hannes Stiller signs a new one-year contract, keeping him at the club until the end of the season.
 4 December 2012: Goalkeeper Erik Dahlin leaves the club, transferring to Sogndal IL.
 12 December 2012: Goalkeeper August Strömberg leaves the club, transferring to Degerfors IF.
 15 December 2012: Defender Hjálmar Jónsson signs a new two-year contract, keeping him at the club until the end of the 2014 season.
 2 January 2013: Forward Sebastian Ohlsson is promoted to the first-team squad, signing a one-year contract to keep him at the club until the end of the season. He is instantly loaned out to Örgryte IS for the duration of the season.
 6 January 2013: Defender Ludwig Augustinsson joins the club on a four-year contract, transferring from IF Brommapojkarna. Nicklas Bärkroth goes in the opposite direction, leaving the club for IF Brommapojkarna.
 21 January 2013: Defender Jonathan Azulay leaves the club on loan to Örgryte IS for the duration of the season.
 16 February 2013: Forward Robin Söder signs a new two-year contract, keeping him at the club until the end of the 2015 season.
 17 February 2013: Midfielder Jakob Johansson is selected as 2012 Archangel of the Year, an annual price given by the Supporterklubben Änglarna to a player who has shown a great loyalty to IFK Göteborg.
 4 March 2013: Martin Kurzwelly is announced as new club director. Bertil Rignäs is selected as new chairman at the annual meeting.
 26 March 2013: Defender Adam Johansson joins the club on a four-year contract, transferring from Seattle Sounders FC.
 29 March 2013: Midfielder Jakob Johansson signs a new one-year contract, keeping him at the club until the end of the 2014 season.
 30 March 2013: Defender Erik Lund leaves the club on loan to Örebro SK until 1 August 2013.
 26 May 2013: IFK Göteborg wins their 6th Svenska Cupen title after defeating Djurgårdens IF in the final. 
 19 June 2013: Midfielder Lasse Vibe joins the club on a three-year contract, transferring from SønderjyskE. Forward David Moberg Karlsson leaves the club, transferring to Sunderland. 
 20 June 2013: Defender Mattias Bjärsmyr signs a new four-year contract, keeping him at the club until the end of the 2017 season.
 2 August 2013: Midfielder Darijan Bojanić joins the club on a four and a half-year contract, transferring from Östers IF. 
 6 August 2013: Midfielder Nordin Gerzić leaves the club on loan to Örebro SK for the rest of the season.
 8 November 2013: Forward and captain Tobias Hysén is selected as Allsvenskan forward of the year and Allsvenskan most valuable player of the year. Goalkeeper John Alvbåge is selected as Allsvenskan voice of the year.

Players

Squad

Youth players with first-team appearances 
Youth players who played a competitive match for the club in 2013.

Players in/out

In

Out

Squad statistics

Appearances and goals

Disciplinary record

Club

Coaching staff

Other information

Competitions

Overall

Allsvenskan

League table

Results summary

Results by round

Matches
Kickoff times are in UTC+2 unless stated otherwise.

Svenska Cupen

2012–13
The tournament continued from the 2012 season.

Kickoff times are in UTC+1 unless stated otherwise.

Group stage

Knockout stage

2013–14
The tournament continued into the 2014 season.

Qualification stage

Svenska Supercupen

UEFA Europa League

Kickoff times are in UTC+2.

Qualifying phase and play-off round

Second qualifying round

Non competitive

Pre-season
Kickoff times are in UTC+1.

References

IFK Göteborg seasons
IFK Goteborg